All American Hockey League may refer to:

All-American Hockey League (1987–89)
All American Hockey League (2008–2011)